Eospilarctia taliensis is a moth of the family Erebidae first described by Walter Rothschild in 1933. It is found in the Chinese provinces of Yunnan, Sichuan and Shaanxi.

References

Moths described in 1933
Spilosomina